MTV Ava is a Finnish television channel owned and operated by MTV Oy.

Programming
 Dallas
 EastEnders
 Emmerdale (reruns)
 Friends
 Melrose Place
 Neighbours
 Salatut elämät (reruns)
 Smash
 The Renovators
 The Tyra Banks Show

Logos

References

External links
AVA official website 

Television channels and stations established in 2008
Television channels in Finland
Bonnier Group